Jonathon is a given name. It is an often used alternative spelling of "Jonathan", as is "Johnathan". Notable people named Jonathon include:

Jonathon Brandmeier (born 1956), a Chicago radio personality and musician
Jonathon Morris (born 1960), English actor and former television presenter
Jonathon Simmons (born 1989), American professional basketball player
Jonathon Young  (born 1973), Canadian actor
Jonathon Porritt (born 1950), a leading British environmentalist and writer
Jonathon Blum (born 1989), American professional ice hockey defenseman, currently playing with HC Sochi of the Kontinental Hockey
Jonathon Webb (born 1983), Australian professional racing driver and team owner of Tekno Autosports